The Military Provost Guard Service (MPGS) is responsible for maintaining physical security at British Armed Forces locations throughout Great Britain. It is one of three constituent units of the Adjutant General's Corps Provost Branch (the other two parts being the Royal Military Police and the Military Provost Staff). The Provost branch is the responsibility of the Provost Marshal who is a Brigadier from the Royal Military Police. The MPGS also works alongside the unarmed Ministry of Defence Guard Service (MGS). In Northern Ireland, armed security at Ministry of Defence establishments is provided by the uniformed civilian Northern Ireland Security Guard Service in a similar manner to that of the MPGS in Great Britain.

History and operational role
The MPGS was formed in the wake of structural changes of the Armed Forces and the increased threat of terrorism in 1997.

The MPGS's duties include:

 Controlling entry and exit access to a site
 Managing control room operations and ensuring all visitors are dealt with efficiently
 Patrolling site perimeters and taking necessary action to preserve perimeter security
 Security incident management, such as suspicious packages, bomb threats, protests, etc.
 Military Working Dog services at some sites.

To join the MPGS, applicants must have served for at least three years in any arm or service, including the Royal Naval Reserve, Royal Marines Reserve, Territorial Army, and Royal Auxiliary Air Force.   They must have completed that service within six years of application to the MPGS, unless they have relevant service in the Police or HM Prison Service since leaving the armed forces.

To join, they have to re-enlist into the Regular British Army on a Military Local Service Engagement (MLSE). The MLSE is a form of engagement which is ideally suited to use by the MPGS. The MLSE is renewable on a three-yearly basis providing the soldier continues to meet the requirements and standards of the service, as well as there being a continued need for MPGS soldiers at that particular unit.

There are 26 police constabularies that currently have a Memorandum of Understanding (MOU) with the Military Provost Guard Service in respect of the legal authority for carrying firearms on UK roads.

Uniform and equipment

MPGS soldiers are issued the same uniform and equipment as other arms and services in the British Army, albeit at a reduced scale due to their barracks-based role. Everyday working dress is the standard Personal Clothing System Combat Uniform (PCS CU) in Multi-Terrain Pattern (MTP), beret with cap badge, belt (or stable belt) and combat boots. The shirt and jacket will have the MPGS tactical recognition flash (see top) on the right sleeve. If soldiers are carrying out security duties on roads or vehicle checks, they may also wear a high-visibility yellow jacket, normally with "SECURITY" or "MILITARY GUARD" printed on the front and back. The main firearm used by the MPGS is the SA80 L85A2 assault rifle; Glock 9 mm semi-automatic pistols may also be used. All MPGS soldiers must pass a weapon handling test biannually to use firearms.

Vehicles
The MPGS utilises Toyota 4x4 pickup vehicles in white or silver with "SERVICE SECURITY PATROL" or "ARMY SECURITY PATROL" on the bonnet, left side, right side and at the rear on top of a yellow fluorescent stripe. Some vehicles have an amber strobe beacon on the roof for increased visibility. In late 2013 the Ministry of Defence purchased Ford Ranger pickups for use within the MPGS and other MOD departments.

See also
 Commandant's Service A similar Russian organisation
 Ministry of Defence Guard Service A similar (unarmed) Civil Service organisation in the UK

References

External links
 Military Provost Guard Service

Adjutant General's Corps